Percy Milton Pennefather (16 July 1923 – 21 December 1975) was a Singaporean field hockey player. He competed in the men's tournament at the 1956 Summer Olympics.

References

External links
 
 

1923 births
1975 deaths
Singaporean male field hockey players
Olympic field hockey players of Singapore
Field hockey players at the 1956 Summer Olympics
Place of birth missing
20th-century Singaporean people